The Intermediate Geographic Region of Uberaba (code 3110) is one of the 13 intermediate geographic regions in the Brazilian state of Minas Gerais and one of the 134 of Brazil, created by the National Institute of Geography and Statistics (IBGE) in 2017.

As of September 2021, the total area was 36,915.2 km² (14253 sq mi) with a population of 825,582 residents.

It comprises 29 municipalities, distributed in 4 immediate geographic regions:

 Immediate Geographic Region of Uberaba.
 Immediate Geographic Region of Araxá.
 Immediate Geographic Region of Frutal.
 Immediate Geographic Region of Iturama.

References 

Geography of Minas Gerais